St. Gallen St. Fiden railway station is a railway station in St. Gallen, in the Swiss canton of St. Gallen. It is an intermediate station on the Bodensee–Toggenburg and Rorschach–St. Gallen lines.

Services 
St. Gallen St. Fiden is served by five services of the St. Gallen S-Bahn:

 : hourly service over the Bodensee–Toggenburg railway between Nesslau-Neu St. Johann and Altstätten SG
 : hourly service over the Bodensee–Toggenburg railway and Rorschach–St. Gallen railway via Sargans (circular operation).
 : hourly service over the Rorschach–St. Gallen railway between Weinfelden and St. Margrethen.
 : rush-hour service over the Bodensee–Toggenburg railway between St. Gallen and Wittenbach.

References

External links 
 
 

Railway stations in the canton of St. Gallen
Swiss Federal Railways stations
Buildings and structures in St. Gallen (city)